Adolf "Adi" Pinter (19 January 1948 – 20 May 2016) was an Austrian football manager.

References

1948 births
2016 deaths
Austrian football managers
Grazer AK managers
Lech Poznań managers
FC Juniors OÖ managers
DSV Leoben managers
Wiener Sport-Club managers
2. Bundesliga managers
Austrian Football Bundesliga managers
Oberliga (football) managers
Regionalliga managers
Croatian Football League managers
Austrian expatriate football managers
Expatriate football managers in Germany
Austrian expatriate sportspeople in Germany
Expatriate football managers in Croatia
Austrian expatriate sportspeople in Croatia
Expatriate football managers in Poland
Austrian expatriate sportspeople in Poland
Sportspeople from Graz